The terms British East and Southeast Asian (BESEA) or simply East and Southeast Asian (ESEA) are used to refer to people in the United Kingdom (UK) who identify with the cultures and ethnicities of East and Southeast Asia.

According to organisations who uses this term, this includes Brunei, Cambodia, China, Timor-Leste, Hong Kong, Indonesia, Japan, Korea (North and South), Laos, Macau, Malaysia, Mongolia, Myanmar, the Philippines, Singapore, Taiwan, Thailand and Vietnam.

Introduction 
The term East and Southeast Asian has emerged in a UK context where the category 'Asian' is predominantly used to refer to those from a South Asian background. It has been adopted to replace the derogatory racialised term 'Oriental'. The term has gained currency following the outbreak of COVID-19 which led to a rise in anti-Asian racial violence and the creation of a number of groups that have organised under the ESEA term. However, pan-ethnic mass mobilisation among East and Southeast Asians in the UK has longer histories – such as Mulan Theatre, New Earth Theatre (formerly Yellow Earth Theatre) and BEATS (British East & South East Asians in the Screen & Stage Industry) in the arts.

A 2020 pilot study of East and Southeast Asian people in the United Kingdom found that close to 95% of respondents identify or feel comfortable with the term British East and Southeast Asian (BESEA) or East and Southeast Asian (ESEA) to describe their identity. In a 2021 article exploring  an East and Southeast Asian identity in the Britain, Diana Yeh describes ESEA as a 'pan-Asian' political identity and alliance which has grown out of wider anti-racist organising in Britain.

COVID-19-related discrimination and racism of ESEA 
The term East and Southeast Asian was used regularly by  personalities, institutions and media reports in relation to discrimination and racism during the COVID-19 pandemic. MP Sarah Owen referred to the term ESEA in parliamentary debates in 2020, while the UK Government condemned attacks on ESEA communities in its response to a petition on the UK Parliament Petition Website which called for more funds to support victims of COVID-19 racism and anti-racism programmes. Academic communities have also discussed this term including studies on COVID-related racism and discussion panels on the experiences of ESEA with discrimination and racism. In 2021, a #StopESEAHate GoFundMe campaign was launched with support from public personalities such as actors Gemma Chan, Benedict Wong and Henry Golding.

Groups which use the term 

The term ESEA is used in the names and mission statements of several organisations and initiatives such as:
 
 Artist Working Group 
 Asian Leadership Collective
 Besea.n
 BEATS
 Campaign Against Racism Group
 China Exchange 
 Daikon
 Don't Call Me Oriental
 East and Southeast Asians for Labour
 East and Southeast Asians in Scotland
 East and Southeast Asians North East
 Edinburgh University ESEA Queer Society
 End Violence and Racism Against ESEA Communities (EVR)
 ESEA Archives Book Club
 esea contemporary (formerly Centre for Chinese Contemporary Art)
 ESEA Green Lions
 ESEA Lit Fest
 ESEA Music
 ESEA Online Community Hub
 ESEA Publishing Network
 ESEA Sisters
 ESEA Young Londoners
 ESEAS Bristol
 Every Asian Voice
 Foundling Productions
 Hackney Chinese Community Services
 Have you eaten yet? Collective
 Hidden Keileon
 Horizons Collective
 Kakilang (formerly Chinese Arts Now)
 Kanlungan
 kindredpacket
 Liverpool ESEA Network
 Moongate Productions
 New Earth Theatre
 On Your Side
 Papergang Theatre
 Racism Unmasked Edinburgh
 Remember Resist 
 SOAS dis-Orient Society
 Southeast and East Asian Centre (SEEAC)
 Tan's Topics 
 UK Civil Service Race Forum's East and South East Asian (ESEA) Working Group
 Voice ESEA

See also 
 Global majority

References

Further reading 
 
 

Ethnic groups in the United Kingdom
United Kingdom
Asian diaspora in the United Kingdom